Francesc D'Asís Bosch Farnés (born 2 May 1988) is a Spanish football manager, who is the current assistant manager of RCD Espanyol B.

Career
Born in Barcelona, Catalonia, Bosch worked as an assistant manager at Thai side Ratchaburi Mitr Phol FC in 2013, before returning to his home region to work as a youth manager of local sides UE Poble Sec, CE Mataró and CF Damm.

On 12 June 2018, Bosch joined Manolo Márquez's staff at NK Istra 1961, being named assistant manager. The following 29 January, he was named manager of former team Ratchaburi, replacing Márquez who resigned days before.

Bosch was replaced by Marco Simone on 23 March 2019, after only one win in four matches. He subsequently moved to RCD Espanyol, joining the B-team's staff.

References

External links

1988 births
Living people
Sportspeople from Barcelona
Spanish football managers
Francesc Bosch
Francesc Bosch
Spanish expatriate football managers
Spanish expatriate sportspeople in Croatia
Spanish expatriate sportspeople in Thailand
Expatriate football managers in Thailand